Olpiidae is a family of pseudoscorpions in the superfamily Garypoidea. It contains the following genera:

Antillolpium Muchmore, 1991
Aphelolpium Hoff, 1964
Apolpium J. C. Chamberlin, 1930
Austrohorus Beier, 1966
Banksolpium Muchmore, 1986
Beierolpium Heurtault, 1976
Calocheiridius Beier & Turk, 1952
Calocheirus J. C. Chamberlin, 1930
Cardiolpium Mahnert, 1986
Ectactolpium Beier, 1947
Euryolpium Redikorzev, 1938
Halominniza ahnert, 1975
Hesperolpium J. C. Chamberlin, 1930
Heterolpium Sivaraman, 1980
Hoffhorus Heurtault, 1976
Horus J. C. Chamberlin, 1930
Indolpium Hoff, 1945
Leptolpium Tooren, 2002
Minniza E. Simon, 1881
Nanolpium Beier, 1947
Neopachyolpium Hoff, 1945
Nipponogarypus Morikawa, 1955
Novohorus Hoff, 1945
Olpiolum Beier, 1931
Olpium L. Koch, 1873
Pachyolpium Beier, 1931
Parolpium Beier, 1931
Planctolpium Hoff, 1964
Progarypus Beier, 1931
Pseudohorus Beier, 1946
Stenolpiodes Beier, 1959
Stenolpium Beier, 1955
Xenolpium J. C. Chamberlin, 1930

References

External links 

 
Pseudoscorpion families